Ozyorny/Ozerny (/; masculine), Ozyornaya/Ozernaya (/; feminine), or Ozyornoye/Ozernoye (/; neuter) is the name of several inhabited localities in Russia.

Altai Krai
As of 2010, three rural localities in Altai Krai bear this name:
Ozerny, Altai Krai, a settlement in Komsomolsky Selsoviet of Pavlovsky District
Ozernoye, Kulundinsky District, Altai Krai, a selo in Semenovsky Selsoviet of Kulundinsky District
Ozernoye, Zarinsky District, Altai Krai, a selo in Starodracheninsky Selsoviet of Zarinsky District

Altai Republic
As of 2010, three rural localities in the Altai Republic bear this name:
Ozernoye, Mayminsky District, Altai Republic, a selo in Manzherokskoye Rural Settlement of Mayminsky District
Ozernoye, Ongudaysky District, Altai Republic, a selo in Tenginskoye Rural Settlement of Ongudaysky District
Ozernoye, Ust-Kansky District, Altai Republic, a selo in Kozulskoye Rural Settlement of Ust-Kansky District

Amur Oblast
As of 2010, one rural locality in Amur Oblast bears this name:
Ozernoye, Amur Oblast, a selo in Ozernensky Rural Settlement of Seryshevsky District

Astrakhan Oblast
As of 2010, one rural locality in Astrakhan Oblast bears this name:
Ozernoye, Astrakhan Oblast, a selo in Ozernovsky Selsoviet of Ikryaninsky District

Republic of Bashkortostan
As of 2010, two rural localities in the Republic of Bashkortostan bear this name:
Ozerny, Republic of Bashkortostan, a selo in Mindyaksky Selsoviet of Uchalinsky District
Ozernoye, Republic of Bashkortostan, a village in Krasnobashkirsky Selsoviet of Abzelilovsky District

Belgorod Oblast
As of 2010, one rural locality in Belgorod Oblast bears this name:
Ozerny, Belgorod Oblast, a khutor under the administrative jurisdiction of  Rovensky Settlement Okrug of Rovensky District

Bryansk Oblast
As of 2010, three rural localities in Bryansk Oblast bear this name:
Ozerny, Pogarsky District, Bryansk Oblast, a settlement in Kistersky Selsoviet of Pogarsky District
Ozyorny, Unechsky District, Bryansk Oblast, a settlement in Rassukhsky Selsoviet of Unechsky District
Ozyornoye, Bryansk Oblast, a village in Novomlynsky Selsoviet of Starodubsky District

Republic of Buryatia
As of 2010, one rural locality in the Republic of Buryatia bears this name:
Ozerny, Republic of Buryatia, a settlement in Ozerny Selsoviet of Yeravninsky District

Chelyabinsk Oblast
As of 2010, three rural localities in Chelyabinsk Oblast bear this name:
Ozerny, Agapovsky District, Chelyabinsk Oblast, a settlement in Buranny Selsoviet of Agapovsky District
Ozerny, Kartalinsky District, Chelyabinsk Oblast, a settlement in Poltavsky Selsoviet of Kartalinsky District
Ozerny, Krasnoarmeysky District, Chelyabinsk Oblast, a settlement in Petrovsky Selsoviet of Krasnoarmeysky District

Irkutsk Oblast
As of 2010, two rural localities in Irkutsk Oblast bear this name:
Ozerny, Bratsky District, Irkutsk Oblast, a settlement in Bratsky District
Ozerny, Usolsky District, Irkutsk Oblast, a settlement in Usolsky District

Ivanovo Oblast
As of 2010, one rural locality in Ivanovo Oblast bears this name:
Ozerny, Ivanovo Oblast, a selo in Ivanovsky District

Jewish Autonomous Oblast
As of 2010, one rural locality in the Jewish Autonomous Oblast bears this name:
Ozernoye, Jewish Autonomous Oblast, a selo in Oktyabrsky District

Kaliningrad Oblast
As of 2010, two rural localities in Kaliningrad Oblast bear this name:
Ozernoye, Chernyakhovsky District, Kaliningrad Oblast, a settlement in Kaluzhsky Rural Okrug of Chernyakhovsky District
Ozernoye, Gvardeysky District, Kaliningrad Oblast, a settlement in Ozerkovsky Rural Okrug of Gvardeysky District

Republic of Kalmykia
As of 2010, one rural locality in the Republic of Kalmykia bears this name:
Ozerny, Republic of Kalmykia, a settlement in Komsomolskaya Rural Administration of Chernozemelsky District

Kaluga Oblast
As of 2010, one rural locality in Kaluga Oblast bears this name:
Ozernoye, Kaluga Oblast, a village in Medynsky District

Komi Republic
As of 2010, one rural locality in the Komi Republic bears this name:
Ozerny, Komi Republic, a settlement in Ozerny Rural-type Settlement Administrative Territory of Pechora

Kostroma Oblast
As of 2010, one rural locality in Kostroma Oblast bears this name:
Ozernaya, Kostroma Oblast, a village in Pyshchugskoye Settlement of Pyshchugsky District

Krasnodar Krai
As of 2010, one rural locality in Krasnodar Krai bears this name:
Ozerny, Krasnodar Krai, a settlement in imeni M. Gorkogo Rural Okrug of Kavkazsky District

Krasnoyarsk Krai
As of 2010, two rural localities in Krasnoyarsk Krai bear this name:
Ozerny, Krasnoyarsk Krai, a settlement in Pochetsky Selsoviet of Abansky District
Ozernoye, Krasnoyarsk Krai, a selo in Ozernovsky Selsoviet of Yeniseysky District

Kurgan Oblast
As of 2010, three rural localities in Kurgan Oblast bear this name:
Ozernoye, Almenevsky District, Kurgan Oblast, a village in Yulamanovsky Selsoviet of Almenevsky District
Ozernoye, Zverinogolovsky District, Kurgan Oblast, a selo in Ozerninsky Selsoviet of Zverinogolovsky District
Ozernaya, Kurgan Oblast, a village in Kamyshinsky Selsoviet of Safakulevsky District

Mari El Republic
As of 2010, one rural locality in the Mari El Republic bears this name:
Ozerny, Mari El Republic, a settlement in Krasnomostovsky Rural Okrug of Kilemarsky District

Republic of Mordovia
As of 2010, two rural localities in the Republic of Mordovia bear this name:
Ozerny, Saransk, Republic of Mordovia, a settlement in Ozerny Selsoviet of the city of republic significance of Saransk
Ozerny, Zubovo-Polyansky District, Republic of Mordovia, a settlement under the administrative jurisdiction of  the work settlement of Yavas, Zubovo-Polyansky District

Nizhny Novgorod Oblast
As of 2010, one rural locality in Nizhny Novgorod Oblast bears this name:
Ozerny, Nizhny Novgorod Oblast, a settlement under the administrative jurisdiction of the work settlement of Shimorskoye, which is under the administrative jurisdiction of the town of oblast significance of Vyksa

Novosibirsk Oblast
As of 2010, four rural localities in Novosibirsk Oblast bear this name:
Ozerny, Chistoozyorny District, Novosibirsk Oblast, a settlement in Chistoozyorny District
Ozerny, Kuybyshevsky District, Novosibirsk Oblast, a settlement in Kuybyshevsky District
Ozerny, Novosibirsky District, Novosibirsk Oblast, a settlement in Novosibirsky District
Ozernoye, Novosibirsk Oblast, a village in Ust-Tarksky District

Omsk Oblast
As of 2010, two rural localities in Omsk Oblast bear this name:
Ozernoye, Nizhneomsky District, Omsk Oblast, a village in Khortitsky Rural Okrug of Nizhneomsky District
Ozernoye, Russko-Polyansky District, Omsk Oblast, a village in Alabotinsky Rural Okrug of Russko-Polyansky District

Orenburg Oblast
As of 2010, two rural localities in Orenburg Oblast bear this name:
Ozerny, Orenburg Oblast, a settlement in Ozerny Selsoviet of Svetlinsky District
Ozernoye, Orenburg Oblast, a selo in Pylayevsky Selsoviet of Pervomaysky District

Oryol Oblast
As of 2010, one rural locality in Oryol Oblast bears this name:
Ozernoye, Oryol Oblast, a village in Mokhovskoy Selsoviet of Pokrovsky District

Primorsky Krai
As of 2010, one rural locality in Primorsky Krai bears this name:
Ozernoye, Primorsky Krai, a selo in Yakovlevsky District

Pskov Oblast
As of 2010, one rural locality in Pskov Oblast bears this name:
Ozernaya, Pskov Oblast, a village in Pustoshkinsky District

Rostov Oblast
As of 2010, one rural locality in Rostov Oblast bears this name:
Ozerny, Rostov Oblast, a settlement in Voznesenskoye Rural Settlement of Morozovsky District

Ryazan Oblast
As of 2010, one rural locality in Ryazan Oblast bears this name:
Ozerny, Ryazan Oblast, a settlement in Bulgakovsky Rural Okrug of Kasimovsky District

Saratov Oblast
As of 2010, two rural localities in Saratov Oblast bear this name:
Ozerny, Saratov Oblast, a settlement in Dergachyovsky District
Ozernoye, Saratov Oblast, a selo in Atkarsky District

Smolensk Oblast
As of 2010, two inhabited localities in Smolensk Oblast bear this name:
Ozyorny, Smolensk Oblast, a settlement under the administrative jurisdiction of Ozernenskoye Urban Settlement of Dukhovshchinsky District
Ozernaya, Smolensk Oblast, a village in Ozernoye Rural Settlement of Shumyachsky District

Stavropol Krai
As of 2010, two rural localities in Stavropol Krai bear this name:
Ozerny, Stavropol Krai, a settlement in Temizhbeksky Selsoviet of Novoalexandrovsky District
Ozernoye, Stavropol Krai, a selo in Verkhnestepnovsky Selsoviet of Stepnovsky District

Sverdlovsk Oblast
As of 2010, two rural localities in Sverdlovsk Oblast bear this name:
Ozerny, Beloyarsky District, Sverdlovsk Oblast, a settlement in Beloyarsky District
Ozerny, Rezhevskoy District, Sverdlovsk Oblast, a settlement in Rezhevsky District

Tambov Oblast
As of 2010, one rural locality in Tambov Oblast bears this name:
Ozerny, Tambov Oblast, a settlement in Nashchekinsky Selsoviet of Bondarsky District

Republic of Tatarstan
As of 2010, one rural locality in the Republic of Tatarstan bears this name:
Ozerny, Republic of Tatarstan, a settlement in Vysokogorsky District

Tomsk Oblast
As of 2010, two rural localities in Tomsk Oblast bear this name:
Ozernoye, Kolpashevsky District, Tomsk Oblast, a selo in Kolpashevsky District
Ozernoye, Teguldetsky District, Tomsk Oblast, a village in Teguldetsky District

Tver Oblast
As of 2010, one urban locality in Tver Oblast bears this name:
Ozyorny, Tver Oblast, an urban-type settlement in Tver Oblast; incorporated as a closed administrative-territorial formation of the same name

Tyumen Oblast
As of 2010, two rural localities in Tyumen Oblast bear this name:
Ozernoye, Tyumen Oblast, a selo in Ozerninsky Rural Okrug of Vikulovsky District
Ozernaya, Tyumen Oblast, a village in Aslaninsky Rural Okrug of Yalutorovsky District

Vladimir Oblast
As of 2010, one rural locality in Vladimir Oblast bears this name:
Ozerny, Vladimir Oblast, a selo in Yuryev-Polsky District

Vologda Oblast
As of 2010, one rural locality in Vologda Oblast bears this name:
Ozerny, Vologda Oblast, a settlement in Mishutinsky Selsoviet of Vozhegodsky District

Voronezh Oblast
As of 2010, one rural locality in Voronezh Oblast bears this name:
Ozerny, Voronezh Oblast, a settlement under the administrative jurisdiction of   Novokhopyorsk Urban Settlement of Novokhopyorsky District

Zabaykalsky Krai
As of 2010, one rural locality in Zabaykalsky Krai bears this name:
Ozernaya, Zabaykalsky Krai, a selo in Chernyshevsky District